William Behan may refer to:
 Billy Behan (1911–1991), Irish footballer
 William J. Behan (1840–1928), American politician